ICD-10
 Indonesia Commodity and Derivatives Exchange